Labbella is a genus of air-breathing sea slugs, a shell-less marine pulmonate gastropod mollusks in the family Onchidiidae.

Species
Species within the genus Labbella include:

 Labella ajuthiae (Labbé, 1935)

References

Onchidiidae
Monotypic gastropod genera